The Mexican Law Review is a bi-annual peer reviewed law journal published by the Institute for Legal Research of the National Autonomous University of Mexico. The Institute has been described as the foremost legal institute in Mexico and Latin America. It was established in 2008 and the editor-in-chief is John Ackerman.

See also
 Law of Mexico

References

External links
 

Mexican law journals
National Autonomous University of Mexico